Dissen is a surname. Notable people with the surname include:

 Georg Ludolf Dissen (1784–1837), German classical philologist
 Heinrich von Dissen (1415–1484), German Carthusian theologian and writer

German-language surnames